Tummel Bridge is a double arched hump-backed former military bridge crossing the River Tummel near Dull, Perth and Kinross, Scotland. A Category A listed structure dating to 1730, it is now pedestrian-only. It stands immediately to the southeast of a modern road bridge, which carries the vehicular traffic of today's B846 road. Two worn milestones are at the northern end of the bridge.

Erected for the Board of Ordnance, to the order of Lieutenant General George Wade, its original purpose was as a military road. The Irvine Robertson papers at the National Records of Scotland contain, at GD1/53/97, the construction contract with John Stewart of Canagan [=Kynachan], for building the bridge, and the receipt by John Stewart for £50, in respect of above contract, 27 July 1730, and the bond by him and David Stewart, his eldest son, to maintain the bridge, 20 October 1730: 

The bridge was renovated in 1973, and underwent conservation work in 2011.

Gallery

See also
List of listed buildings in Dull, Perth and Kinross

References

Category A listed buildings in Perth and Kinross
Listed bridges in Scotland
Bridges in Perth and Kinross
Bridges completed in 1730
1730 establishments in Scotland